The Arboretum de Forêt Verte is an arboretum located within the Forêt Domaniale Verte near Houppeville, Seine-Maritime, Normandy, France. It was created in 1970 to study resistance of different trees to pollution.

See also 
 List of botanical gardens in France

References 
 Agglo-Rouennaise history (French)
 Charte Forestière de Territoire – Rapport d’activités de l’année 2005 (French)

Gardens in Seine-Maritime
Foret Verte